Jin Yan (born 27 July 1972) is a female Chinese former football forward. She was part of the China women's national football team  at the 2000 Summer Olympics.

International goals

See also
 China at the 2000 Summer Olympics

References

External links
 
 soccerpunter
 New York Times

 Seattle Times
 Getty Images
 si.com

1972 births
Living people
Chinese women's footballers
Place of birth missing (living people)
Footballers at the 2000 Summer Olympics
Olympic footballers of China
Women's association football forwards
Asian Games medalists in football
Footballers at the 1998 Asian Games
China women's international footballers
Asian Games gold medalists for China
Medalists at the 1998 Asian Games
1999 FIFA Women's World Cup players